The 37th Aviation Division (37. ваздухопловна дивизија) was a unit originally established in 1944 as the 42nd Aviation Assault Division (42. ваздухопловна јуришна дивизија).  It was formed from Yugoslav Partisan aviators, trained and equipped by the Soviet Air Force.

History

42nd Aviation Assault Division
The 42nd Aviation Assault Division was established during the December 1944, in Novi Sad, from Yugoslav Partisan aviators with the assistance of the Soviet Air Force 17th Air Army's 10th Guards Assault Aviation Division (165.GShAD). It became independent of Soviet command and personnel in May 1945. The division was part of the Soviet Group of Aviation Divisions, and consisted of three fighter regiments. It took part in the final operations for the  liberation of Yugoslavia. During combat operations, its headquarters was at Novi Sad. 
The division had about 1100 personnel, 114 officers, 254 NCO's and 732 soldiers. Of that number, 253 were pilots and 653 were technicians. It was equipped with 125 Ilyushin Il-2 assault aircraft.
In August 1945, the division was reorganized and renamed as the 2nd Aviation Mixed Division (2. ваздухопловна мешовита дивизија).

The commander of the division in this period was Jevrem Bjelica, and the political commissar was Enver Ćemalović.

2nd Aviation Division
The 2nd Aviation Mixed Division was formed on August 3, 1945, from the 42nd Aviation Assault Division with its headquarters in Zagreb. The division was directly under the Command of the Yugoslav Air Force. In 1947, the division was renamed the 2nd Aviation Assault Division (2. ваздухопловна јуришна дивизија).

In 1948, the division was again renamed, becoming the 37th Assault Aviation Division (37. ваздухопловна јуришна дивизија).

The commanders of the division in this period were Jevrem Bjelica and Viktor Bubanj. The political commissars were Enver Ćemalović and Stane Bobnar.

37th Aviation Division

The 37th Aviation Assault Division was formed by renaming the 2nd Aviation Assault Division in 1948. It underwent some minor organisational changes at this time.

In 1949, the division was attached to the 3rd Aviation Corps. It relocated its headquarters from Zagreb to Cerklje. In 1954, it was renamed as the Aviation Fighter-Bomber Division due to the replacement of Soviet aircraft with US-made fighter-bombers.

It was disbanded on June 27, 1959, under the "Drvar" reorganization plan. Its command was transformed into the headquarters of the 7th Air Command and its units were attached to the 5th Air Command.

The commanders of the division in this period were Viktor Bubanj, Vladimir Bakarić, Zlatko Predavec, Milan Simović and Svetozar Radojević. Its commissars were Enver Ćemalović and Veljko Ražnatović until 1953.

Assignments
Group of aviation divisions (1944-1945)
Command of Yugoslav Air Force (1945-1949)
3rd Aviation Corps (1949–1959)

Previous designations
42nd Aviation Assault Division (1944-1945)
2nd Aviation Mixed Division (1945-1947)
2nd Aviation Assault Division (1947-1948)
37th Aviation Assault Division (1948-1954)
37th Aviation Fighter-Bomber Division (1954-1959)

Organization

1944-1945
42nd Aviation Assault Division
421st Assault Aviation Regiment
422nd Assault Aviation Regiment
423rd Assault Aviation Regiment

1945
42nd Aviation Assault Division
422nd Assault Aviation Regiment
423rd Assault Aviation Regiment
112th Fighter Aviation Regiment

1945-1947
2nd Aviation Mixed Division
113th Fighter Aviation Regiment
421st Assault Aviation Regiment
422nd Assault Aviation Regiment
423rd Assault Aviation Regiment

1947-1948
2nd Aviation Assault Division
421st Assault Aviation Regiment
422nd Assault Aviation Regiment
423rd Assault Aviation Regiment

1948-1959
37th Aviation Assault/Fighter-Bomber Division
Training Squadron of 37th Aviation Division (1953-1959)
715th Independent Reconnaissance Squadron (1949-1952)
96th Assault Aviation Regiment
111th Assault Aviation Regiment
138th Assault Aviation Regiment (1949–1958)
474th Air Base

Headquarters
Novi Sad (1944-1945)
Zagreb (1945-1951)
Cerklje (1951-1959)

Commanding officers
Colonel Jevrem Bjelica
Colonel Viktor Bubanj	
Colonel Vladimir Bakarić	
Major Zlatko Predavec (defected with Po-2 aircraft to Austria in 1950.)
Colonel Milan Simović	
Colonel Svetozar Radojević

Political commissars
Lieutenant-Colonel Enver Ćemalović	
Colonel Stane Bobnar
Colonel Enver Ćemalović	
Colonel Veljko Ražnatović

References

Notes and citations

Bibliography
 
 
 
 

Divisions of Yugoslav Air Force
Military units and formations established in 1944
Divisions of the Yugoslav Partisans
Military units and formations disestablished in 1959